Adama is a Hebrew given name meaning earth or soil, and a Hindu surname.

People with the given name Adama
Adama "Manadja" Fanny, musician in the Ivorian musical group Magic System
Adama Ba (born 1993), Mauritanian footballer
Adama Barro (born 1996), Burkinabé footballer
Adama Barrow (born 1965), Gambian politician
Adama Cissé (born 1967), Senegalese footballer
Adama Koné Clofie (born 1967), Ivorian footballer
Adama Coulibaly (born 1980), Malian footballer
Adama Coulibaly (born 1998), Malian basketball player
Adama Damballey (born 1957), Gambian wrestler
Adama Diakhaby (born 1996), French footballer
Adama Diakhaté (born 1970), Senegalese footballer
Adama Diakhite (born 1997), Senegalese basketball player
Adama Diakité (disambiguation)
 Adama Diakité (born 1978), Malian footballer in 2002 African Cup of Nations
 Adama Diakité (footballer, born 1991), French footballer
 Adama Diakité (footballer, born 1993), Ivorian footballer in Italy
Adama Diatta (born 1988), Senegalese wrestler
Adama Smith Dickens (born 1992), Congolese footballer
Adama Dieng (born 1950), African politician
Adama Diomande (born 1990), Norwegian footballer
Adama Dosso, Ivorian diplomat
Adama Drabo (1948–2009), Malian filmmaker and playwright
Adama Fall (born 1950), Senegalese sprinter
Adama Fofana (disambiguation)
Adama Fofana (footballer, born 1989), Ivorian footballer, forward
Adama Fofana (footballer, born 1999), Ivorian footballer, defender
Adama Fofana (footballer, born 2001), Ivorian footballer, winger
Adama Guira (born 1988), Burkinabé footballer
Adama Jalloh (born 1993), British photographer
Adama Jammeh (sprinter) (born 1993), Gambian sprinter
Adama Jammeh (born 2000), Gambian footballer
Adama Jarjue (born 1997), Gambian footballer
Adama Kéïta (born 1990), Malian footballer
Adama Koné (born 1987), Ivory Coast footballer
Adama Kouyaté (1928–2020), Malian photographer
Adama Lamikanra, Nigerian judge
Adama Mbengue (born 1993), Senegalese footballer
Adama Ndiaye, Senegalese fashion designer
Adama Niane (born 1993), Malian footballer
Adama Njie (born 1978), Gambian runner
Adama Ouédraogo (born 1987), Burkinabé swimmer
Adama Samassékou, African politician
Adama Sane (born 2000), Senegalese footballer
Adama Sanogo (born 2002), Malian basketball player
Adama Sarr (born 1991), Senegalese footballer
Adama Sawadogo (born 1990), Burkinabé football goalkeeper
Adama François Sene (born 1989), Senegalese footballer
Adama Soumaoro (born 1992), French footballer
Adama Soumaré (born 1982), French-Burundian footballer
Adama Sulemana, Ghanaian politician
Adama Tamba (born 1998), Gambian footballer
Adama Tamboura (born 1985), Malian footballer
Adama Touré (born 1991), Malian footballer
Adama Traoré (disambiguation), multiple people

People with the surname Adama
Barack Adama, French rapper from Senegal
Osumanu Adama (born 1980), Ghanaian boxer

See also
Adama (Battlestar Galactica), for fictional characters with the surname

Feminine given names
Hebrew feminine given names
Hindu surnames